Charlotte Sophie Luise Wilhelmine von Ahlefeld (December 6, 1781 – July 27, 1849) was a German novelist.

Von Ahlefeld was born  in Ottmannshausen, near Erfurt, as Charlotte von Seebach, to a noble family of Hanover. She began to write at a young age, with her first novel appearing in 1797, and attracted positive comments from Goethe. She married Johann Ritter von Ahlefeld, a landowner from Schleswig, on May 21, 1798. They separated in 1807, but she continued to live in Schleswig until 1821, when she moved to Weimar and befriended Charlotte von Stein. In 1846 she went to the spa town of Teplitz in Bohemia due to declining health, and died there in 1849. She wrote some of her novels under the pen name Elise Selbig, and some poetry under the name Natalia.

Selected novels
 Liebe und Trennung (1797)
 Marie Müller (1799)
 Erna (1820)
 Felicitas (1826)

References

Bibliography
 
 
 Charlotte von Ahlefeld on Dansk Forfatterleksikon (in Danish)

External links
 

1781 births
1849 deaths
People from Weimarer Land
Writers from Thuringia
German women novelists
19th-century German novelists
19th-century German women writers
House of Ahlefeldt